was a railway operator in Japan. The company's name, which consists of "Kitakinki" meaning northern Kinki region and "Tango" meaning Tango Province, is occasionally abbreviated as KTR.

KTR was a so-called "third sector" company jointly funded by local governments and private entities. Its leading shareholder is the Kyoto Prefecture government with a 44.71% ownership. It headquarters in Fukuchiyama, Kyoto Prefecture.

In 2015, the company ceased to operate the trains on its own lines when Willer Trains Inc., under the brand name Kyoto Tango Railway, succeeded this function from KTR. KTR continues to own the tracks and rolling stock.

Lines 
KTR owns the following two regional railway lines:
 Miyafuku Line (in Kyoto Prefecture, 30.4 km)
 Miyazu Line (in Kyoto Prefecture and Hyōgo Prefecture, 83.6 km)

History 
The Miyafuku Line was completed in 1988. In the same year, local governments selected the company as the operator of the existing Miyazu Line, which was to be separated from West Japan Railway Company (JR West) in 1990.

Following the downturn in the business, investors including the Kyoto Prefecture government decided to introduce a new scheme of business, in which a separate company would operate trains on the tracks of KTR. Willer Group, being the only applicant for this proposal, was selected as the operator and later established Willer Trains Inc. The transfer of business took effect on April 1, 2015.

 1982-09-22 – Incorporation as Miyafuku Railway Corporation
 1982-12-24 – Issuance of railway business license of the Miyafuku Line
 1988-06-22 – Shareholders' approval to the purchase of Miyazu Line business
 1988-07-16 – Inauguration of the Miyafuku Line
 1989-09-29 – Issuance of railway business license of the Miyazu Line
 1989-08-01 – Change of corporate name to Kitakinki Tango Railway Corporation
 1990-04-01 – Transfer of business of the Miyazu Line from JR West to KTR
 1996-03-16 – Electrification of the entire Miyafuku Line and Miyazu–Amanohashidate segment of the Miyazu Line
 2007-09-01 – Relocation of corporate headquarters from a prefecture government building in Kyoto to a JR West building in Fukuchiyama
 2015-04-01 – Transfer of train operation function to Willer Trains

References

External links

 

Railway companies of Japan
Rail transport in Kyoto Prefecture
Rail transport in Hyōgo Prefecture
Railway companies established in 1982
1982 establishments in Japan
Japanese third-sector railway lines